Hans C. Noel (born November 3, 1971) is an American political scientist.

He is an associate professor at Georgetown University's Department of Government.

Noel graduated from Northwestern University 1994 with a bachelor's degree in journalism. He pursued graduate studies at UCLA's Department of Political Science (M.A. 1999, Ph.D. 2006).

Noel was a fellow in the Center for the Study of Democratic Politics in the Woodrow Wilson School of Public and International Affairs at Princeton University. From 2008 to 2010, Noel was a Robert Wood Johnson Scholar in Health Policy Research at the University of Michigan.

Noel is a part of the UCLA School of Political Parties, which holds that political parties are created by intense policy demanders, rather than by ambitious politicians.

Publications

References

American political scientists
Georgetown University faculty
University of California, Los Angeles alumni
Medill School of Journalism alumni
1971 births
Living people
University of Michigan people